Alexander James Kisselburgh, Jr. (September 4, 1919 – July 10, 1996) was an American football player.  He played college football for the Oregon State Beavers football team from 1938 to 1940 and was selected by the Associated Press as a third-team player on the 1940 College Football All-America Team.  In January 1941, he joined the United States Army Air Corps. He joined the Army All-Star West football team in 1942.  He flew 35 missions over the European Theater during World War II and was shot down northeast of Munich in February 1944; he spent the rest of the war in a German prisoner of war camp in Moosburg, Germany. He returned to the United States in June 1945.

References 

1919 births
1996 deaths
American football halfbacks
Oregon State Beavers football players
Players of American football from Wisconsin
People from Ashland, Wisconsin
Military personnel from Wisconsin
United States Army Air Forces pilots of World War II